Crash! is a 1977 film directed by Charles Band. It starred José Ferrer, Sue Lyon, John Ericson, Leslie Parrish, John Carradine and Reggie Nalder.

Synopsis
Jealous invalid husband (Ferrer) tries to kill sexy blond wife (Lyon), who uses occult powers and devices to try to kill him.

Cast
 José Ferrer - Marc Denne 
 Sue Lyon - Kim Denne 
 John Ericson - Dr. Gregg Martin 
 Leslie Parrish - Kathy Logan 
 John Carradine - Dr. Edwards 
 Jerome Guardino - Lt. Pegler 
 Paul Dubov - Dr. Cross 
 Reggie Nalder - Man at Swap

Production
The film had the working title "The Transfusion" before it was changed to "Crash!".

Reception
DreadCentral gave it 3 out of 5.

Home media
The film was released on DVD in Germany. In 2015, the film was released on DVD in the USA via Band's Full Moon Pictures.

References

External links
 

1977 films
Films directed by Charles Band
1977 horror films
American auto racing films
1970s English-language films
1970s American films